The DN-V Búfalo (Buffalo) is a Mexican-made self-propelled 75 mm howitzer.

History
The DN-V Bufalo was created in 1984 by SEDENA and DINA S.A. in Mexico, and only a few were made, they are used in the Mexican Army.

Design
The Búfalo uses the turret of the Howitzer Motor Carriage M8 with the body of Mexico's DN series armored personnel carriers and infantry fighting Vehicles. The DN-V Bufalo was made for Mobile Artillery support for Mexican Infantry.

Armament 
Primary: M8 75 mm Howitzer 
Secondary: .50 caliber (12.7 mm) M2 machine gun

See also
 Howitzer Motor Carriage M8

References

Artillery of Mexico